Voorn is a Dutch surname. Notable people with the surname include:

 Albert Voorn (born 1956), Dutch equestrian
 Dick Voorn (born 1948), Dutch football manager
 Jessey Voorn (born 1990), Dutch basketball player
 Joop Voorn (born 1932), Dutch composer
 Joris Voorn (born 1977), Dutch DJ
 Orlando Voorn, Dutch DJ
 Vincent Voorn (born 1984), Dutch show jumper

See also
 Vorn

Dutch-language surnames